Galeazzo Rivelli (also called Galeazzo della Barba) was an Italian painter of the 14th century, active in Cremona.

References

15th-century Italian painters
Italian male painters
Painters from Cremona
Year of death unknown
Year of birth unknown